The ransom theory of atonement was a theory in Christian theology as to how the process of Atonement in Christianity had happened. It therefore accounted for the meaning and effect of the death of Jesus Christ. It was one of a number of historical theories, and was mostly popular between the 4th and 11th centuries, with little support in recent times. It originated in the early Church, particularly in the work of Origen. The theory teaches that the death of Christ was a ransom sacrifice, usually said to have been paid to Satan, in satisfaction for the bondage and debt on the souls of humanity as a result of inherited sin.

New Testament on ransom 

In Matthew 20:28, Jesus says "the Son of Man...came...to give his life as a ransom for many." 1 Timothy 2:6 states that Jesus "gave himself as ransom for all."

Theological views of Christ as ransom 

The ransom view can be summarized as follows:

St. Augustine wrote the following to explain the theory:

However, Augustine's own stance on the issue is not entirely clear; his writings support both the ransom theory and the recapitulation theory of atonement at different times, perhaps indicating that he perceived both theories as compatible with each other.

"Redeeming" in this case literally means "buying back," and the ransoming of war captives from slavery was a common practice in the era. There were some who held different positions, however. The commentary on Romans attributed to Pelagius (who was declared a heretic, though for his view of grace, not his view of atonement) gives a description of the atonement which states that a person's sins have "sold them to death," and not to the devil, and that these sins alienate them from God, until Jesus, dying, ransomed people from death.

Writing in the 4th century, St. Athanasius of Alexandria proposed a theory of the atonement which similarly states that sin bears the consequence of death, that God warned Adam about this, and so, to remain consistent with Himself must have Jesus die as Man's perfect prototype, or let humankind die mired in sin. This has some similarity to the satisfaction view, although Athanasius emphasized the fact that this death is effective because of our unity with Christ, rather than emphasizing a legal substitution or transfer of merits and that when Jesus descended into hades (variously, the underworld or hell, the abode of the dead) he eliminated death with his own death, since the power of death cannot hold God, Who is Life, captive.

Anselm, an 11th-century scholastic theologian and second Archbishop of Canterbury after the Norman conquest, argued against the then-current version of the ransom view, saying that Satan, being himself a rebel and outlaw, could never have a just claim against human beings. The Catholic Encyclopedia calls the idea that God must pay the Devil a ransom "certainly startling, if not revolting." Philosopher and theologian Keith Ward, among others, pointed out that, under the ransom view, not only was God a debtor but a deceiver as well, since God only pretended to pay the debt.

Others, such as Gustaf Aulén, have suggested that the meaning of the ransom theory should not be taken in terms of a business transaction (who receives payment), but rather as the emancipation of human beings from the bondage of sin and death. Aulén's book, Christus Victor, maintained that the Early Church view had been mischaracterized, and proposed a re-evaluated Ransom Theory as a superior alternative to Satisfaction Theory.

Anselm himself went on to explicate the satisfaction view of atonement, now espoused by the Roman Catholic Church.

Presently the "ransom-to-Satan" view of atonement, literally interpreted, is not widely accepted in the West, except by some Anabaptist peace churches and a few figures in the Word of Faith movement, such as Kenneth Copeland.

The United States Conference of Catholic Bishops comments on Matthew 20:28 that the word ransom "does not necessarily express the idea of liberation by payment of some price. The cognate verb is used frequently in the LXX of God’s liberating Israel from Egypt or from Babylonia after the Exile; see Ex 6:6; 15:13; Ps 77:16 (76 LXX); Is 43:1; 44:22."

In the Eastern Church 

Origen of Alexandria, Gregory of Nyssa, and Augustine of Hippo taught views in line with the standard Ransom theory and the Liturgy of St. Basil the Great (celebrated ten times annually in the Byzantine Rite) speaks of Christ as a ransom unto death, other Church Fathers such as Gregory the Theologian vigorously denied that Christ was ransomed to Satan or any evil power, though he does not by any means deny that Christ was a ransom. In his Catechetical Orations, Cyril of Jerusalem suggests Christ's ransom was in fact paid to God the Father.

In the Roman Catholic Church 

The Catechism of the Catholic Church, an authoritative summary of official Roman Catholic teaching, describes the ransom paid by Christ at Calvary as a "mystery of universal redemption", but does not make any indication regarding to whom it was paid, or even that it was paid to any particular being at all.

Protestantism

The alternative view arising in the Reformation, and argued by prominent reformers like Luther, Calvin and Wesley, is penal substitution.

Lutheranism
Gustaf Aulén (1879-1977), a Swedish bishop in the Lutheran Church of Sweden, reinterpreted the ransom theory as a victory of Christ over the powers of evil, instead of as a ransom.

Adventism
In Adventism, all of humankind is considered to have inherited sin and death as a result of Adam's sin in the Garden of Eden. In this view, God's divine law requires that only the sacrificial death of a perfect human can atone for Adamic sin. Faith in the ransom of Jesus Christ—the Last Adam—is regarded as the only way to atone for sin and escape death. Jehovah's Witnesses and the Seventh-day Adventist Church are among the denominations that hold to this view.

References

Sources

Primary sources
 
 
 

Secondary sources

 

 

Atonement in Christianity
Christian terminology
Catholic theology and doctrine
Heresy in the Catholic Church